Fabiana García Lago is an Argentine actress. She has appeared in the television series Padre Coraje, Hombres de honor, Sos mi vida and Malparida.

Biography
At the age of 19, Fabiana García Lago moved to Spain to begin her acting career; she wanted to avoid the influence of her acting family, as her father Juan Carlos Galván and her aunt Virginia Lago were both established stage and screen actors in Argentina.  She studied with the Argentine actress Cristina Rota and returned to Argentina three years later. She also studied at the Instituto Universitario Nacional del Arte in Argentina.

Her first theatrical play was as part of the cast of "Violeta viene a nacer" (Violeta is Born), which also included her aunt Virginia. She worked in the San Martín and Cervantes theaters in Buenor Aires while also auditioning for TV roles, initially without success. She was nominated for the "Cóndor de plata" award and received the "Lauro sin cortes" ("Lauro uncut") award in 1997 for her work in the 1996 movie Flores amarillas en la ventana (Yellow Flowers in the Window). Her first notable television role as a supporting character was in the 2004 television drama Padre Coraje (Brave Father John) in which she played a mute girl. The movie was awarded the Golden Martín Fierro award in 2004. García Lago's performance in the drama program also garnered her the Clarín Award for Best New Actress as well as a nomination for the Martín Fierro "Revelación" Award, which is awarded to the year's best new actress or actor. The following year she was nominated for Best Supporting Drama Actress at the Martín Fierro Awards for her performance in Hombres de honor (Men of Honor).

In 2006 she played a Paraguayan immigrant in the comedy Sos mi vida (You Are the One). The original script did not detail the ethnic origin of her character, only that she would not be from Buenos Aires; the decision to make the character Paraguayan came after García Lago tried the Guarani language accent during the first day of filming. She later appeared in Mujeres de nadie (Women of Nobody) and Patito feo (Ugly Duckling). She was a lead actresses in the 2010 telenovela Malparida (The Wicked Girl), playing an orphan who loves her adoptive mother and sister in spite of their crimes. She currently works as an acting coach.

Works

Television 

 Con alma de tango - 1994
 La condena de Gabriel Doyle 1998
 Especiales de Alejandro Doria 1998
 Vulnerables 1999
 Luna Salvaje - 2000
 Laberinto - 2001
 Máximo Corazón - 2002
 Padre Coraje - 2004
 Hombres de Honor - 2005
 Algo habrán hecho por la historia argentina - 2005
 Sos mi vida - 2006
 Mujeres de nadie - 2007
 Patito feo - 2008

Cinema 

 Flores amarillas en la ventana - 1996
 Buenos Aires plateada - 2000
 El buen destino - 2005
 Las manos - 2006

Theater 
 Chicas católicas
 El libro de Ruth
 Los siete locos
 Brilla por ausencia
 Locos de verano
 Mariana Pineda
 Violeta viene a nacer

Awards
 Flores amarillas en la ventana (Yellow Flowers in the Window) (1996)
 1997 - "Lauro sin cortes" (won)
 1997 - "Cóndor de plata" (nominated)
 Padre Coraje (Brave Father John) (2004)
 2004 - Clarín Award (won) for Best New Actress
 2004 - Martín Fierro award (nominated) for Best New Actress
 Hombres de honor (Men of Honor) (2005)
 2005 - Martín Fierro award (nominated) for Best Supporting Drama Actress

References

External links
 
 Actores online 

Argentine actresses
Living people
Year of birth missing (living people)